Jeff Reinert is an American basketball coach and former collegiate basketball player. On May 21, 2019, Reinert became the 18th head coach in program history at the College of Southern Idaho.

From Bellingham, Washington, Reinert played college basketball for the University of New Mexico in Albuquerque, then transferred to Gonzaga University in Spokane in 1982 and played for the Bulldogs from 1983-85. He was a teammate of future Basketball Hall of Famer John Stockton during the 1983–84 season. 

In 1985–86, he played professional basketball in Australia for the Ipswich Eagles before beginning his coaching career.

Head coaching record

High school

College

References

External links
College of Southern Idaho coach profile

Living people
Year of birth missing (living people)
American expatriate basketball people in Australia
American men's basketball coaches
American men's basketball players
Basketball coaches from Washington (state)
Basketball players from Washington (state)
BYU Cougars men's basketball coaches
Drake University alumni
Fresno State Bulldogs men's basketball coaches
Gonzaga Bulldogs men's basketball players
High school basketball coaches in California
Nebraska Cornhuskers men's basketball coaches
New Mexico Lobos men's basketball players
Oregon State Beavers men's basketball coaches
Southern Idaho Golden Eagles men's basketball coaches
Sportspeople from Bellingham, Washington
Utah Valley Wolverines men's basketball coaches